Julio Torres (born February 11, 1987) is a Salvadoran writer, comedian, and actor. He is best known as a writer for Saturday Night Live and as the co-creator, writer, and executive producer of the HBO series Los Espookys. He previously wrote for The Chris Gethard Show on truTV.

Early life and education 
Julio Torres was born in 1987 in San Salvador, El Salvador. His father is a civil engineer, and his mother is an architect and fashion designer; she, along with his designer sister, has collaborated with him on his comedy projects.

Torres moved to New York to attend The New School, where he graduated with a degree in literary studies in 2011. His aim had always been to pursue a career in comedy writing.

Career 
Torres worked as a writer on The Chris Gethard Show before being hired to write for Saturday Night Live. He worked at SNL from 2016 to 2019, writing sketches including "Papyrus" and "Wells for Boys." He was nominated for four Emmys as a member of the SNL writing team.

He has also appeared on The Tonight Show and other late-night programs. His comedy is frequently described by critics as "otherworldly" and "surrealist," with elements of the fantastical and a melancholy undercurrent.

After pitching a Spanish-language comedy to HBO, the comedian Fred Armisen brought Torres and Ana Fabrega on to co-write the series. Armisen and Torres had met when the former hosted SNL. Torres was also a co-showrunner and actor on the project, which became Los Espookys. The first season aired in 2019, and it was renewed for a second season later that year. Torres plays Andrés, a wealthy heir who searches for answers about his mysterious past.

His comedy special My Favorite Shapes premiered August 10, 2019, on HBO. It was directed by his frequent collaborator Dave McCary and produced by Fred Armisen and Lorne Michaels.

Torres played the gay barista Jules in the 2021 comedy film Together Together.

Torres' first feature film, Problemista is slated for release in 2023.

Personal life 

He is gay. He is a vegan.

Filmography

Film

Television

References

Further reading

External links 

Living people
1987 births
American gay actors
LGBT Hispanic and Latino American people
Salvadoran emigrants to the United States
American comedians
Comedy writers
The New School alumni
Salvadoran LGBT people
American LGBT comedians